Jens Deimel (born 14 September 1972 in Winterberg, North Rhine-Westphalia) is a former German nordic combined skier who competed from 1992 to 2002. He won a bronze medal in the 3 x 10 km team event at the 1993 FIS Nordic World Ski Championships in Falun and had his best individual finish of 15th twice at the championships (1999 – 15 km individual, 2001 - 7.5 km sprint).

Competing at the 1998 Winter Olympics in Nagano, he finished sixth in the 4 x 5 km team event.

Deimel's bet individual career finish was 3rd on three occasions (1992, 1993, 1994).

External links 

1972 births
Living people
People from Winterberg
Sportspeople from Arnsberg (region)
Olympic Nordic combined skiers of Germany
Olympic ski jumpers of Germany
Ski jumpers at the 1992 Winter Olympics
Nordic combined skiers at the 1992 Winter Olympics
Nordic combined skiers at the 1998 Winter Olympics
German male Nordic combined skiers
FIS Nordic World Ski Championships medalists in Nordic combined